Liquid Sky are an English progressive metal band from Manchester, England, UK. Their music combines progressive and symphonic elements, drawing influences from a wide variety of bands like Lacuna Coil, Paradise Lost, Dream Theater and Soilwork.

History
In early 2000, Emily Garrard brought together musicians Jonathan Craven, Audie Lewis, James Ward and Den Constable, to form the band Liquid Sky. Their first release was the EP Adrenochrome in 2001. In 2002, Emily was replaced by Fiona Creaby and the band subsequently released another EP, entitled Nightfall (2003). The record Bloodline was released in 2004, which combined these two EPs along with some previously unreleased tracks. In 2004, the band performed at Bloodstock Open Air Festival. Following this performance, the band parted company with vocalist Fiona Creaby, to be replaced by Hecate Taglietti.

The band toured extensively for several years while honing their material and commenced work on their next album in 2006. In December 2007, Liquid Sky recruited guitarist Andy Midgley as a permanent member of the band. The album - entitled "Identity" - was finally released in February 2008 on new label Insomnia Media, having taken over 2 years to complete (due to technical issues and line-up changes). "Identity" received rave reviews, due to the strong song-writing and the stand-out vocal performance of Hecate. The band completed their first UK headlining tour to promote the album early in 2008.

Soon after the tour, Hecate Taglietti and Anthony Marginson (drums) left the band to focus on their musical careers outside of the metal scene. Liquid Sky replaced them with Tiffeny Joyce (vocals) and Stuart Wright (drums) and began to write and record new material immediately. Following a storming set headlining the Lava Stage at Bloodstock Open Air 2008, the band completed several headline UK tours in late 2008, as well as appearances at the Rock Of Ages Festival in Birmingham and the Metieval Festival in Hull. The band parted company with Stuart Wright in December 2008, replacing him in January 2009 with Alex Goodwin of Into The Woods. In September 2009 it was announced that the band had also parted company with vocalist Tiffeny Joyce and were seeking a replacement.

Liquid Sky issued a statement on 12 December 2009 via a Myspace blog stating they have found a new vocalist, more details shall be revealed early in 2010. The band is also in pre-production stages for the forthcoming, as-yet-untitled studio album - the follow-up to "Identity" - due for release in late 2010.

On 13 March 2010, it was announced that guitarist Andy Midgley had departed from the band to focus on his tenure with Power Quest. At the same time, Leann Baines was announced as the new lead vocalist of LIQUID SKY. However, after further touring, the band went on hiatus in November 2010.

In December 2012, the band announced that recording had commenced for a forthcoming, as-yet-untitled album. They have also announced that they have a line-up of musicians ready to start playing live again in 2013, previewing material from the forthcoming album.

Band members
Jonathan Craven - Lead & Rhythm Guitar (2000-present)
Alex Goodwin - Drums (2009-present)
Rhyenna Biddell-Butler - Bass (2017-present)

Touring members 
Katie Thompson - Vocals (2018-present)

Discography

Albums
Identity (2008) (Hecate Taglietti - Vocals)
Bloodline (2004) (Emily Garrard/Fiona Creaby - Vocals)

EPs
Nightfall (2003) (Fiona Creaby - Vocals)
Adrenochrome (2001) (Emily Garrard - Vocals)

References

English gothic metal musical groups
Musical groups from Manchester
Musical groups established in 2000